Eupithecia biedermanata is a moth in the family Geometridae first described by Samuel E. Cassino and Louis W. Swett in 1922. It is found in the US state of Arizona.

The length of the forewings is 9–10.5 mm. The forewings of the typical form are ferruginous. The forewings of form miamata (which was originally described as a species) are dull coppery gray. Adults have been recorded on wing in April and May.

The larvae feed on the flowers of Arbutus arizonica. They are cryptically patterned and colored to blend with the flowers of the host plant. Pupation takes place in May. The host plant of the gray phenotype miamata may be another shrub with a gray or grayish-brown bark to which the adults are color adapted. A possible host is Garrya flavescens.

References

Moths described in 1922
biedermanata
Moths of North America